Tarasova is a rural locality (a village) in Oshibskoye Rural Settlement, Kudymkarsky District, Perm Krai, Russia. The population was 22 as of 2010.

Geography 
Tarasova is located 37 km northeast of Kudymkar (the district's administrative centre) by road. Petukhova is the nearest rural locality.

References 

Rural localities in Kudymkarsky District